Egglfing-Obernberg Hydropower Plant is a run-of-the-river hydroelectric power plant on the Inn, where the river forms the border between Germany and Austria. The municipality of Egglfing, Bavaria is located on the left side of the Inn and the municipality of Obernberg, Upper Austria on the right side.

History
In order to supply an aluminium smelter near Braunau with power, two hydropower plants were to be constructed on the Inn: Ering-Frauenstein and Egglfing-Obernberg. Work on the Ering-Frauenstein plant began in February 1939. In January 1943 all 3 machines were operational.

Work on the Egglfing-Obernberg hydropower plant began in July 1941. The first turbine went on line in October 1944, the second in January 1946. The 6th machine went on line in September 1950. Last construction works were finished in July 1951.

Dam
The dam is a concrete gravity dam. The powerhouse with the 6 generators is on the left side of the Inn. The spillway is on the right side and has five gates, each with a length of 23 m. Upstream of the powerhouse the dam features an additional concrete wall as a protection against bombs.

Reservoir
At full reservoir level of 325.90 m the reservoir of the dam has a length of 12.7 km. On both sides of the reservoir are embankment dams. The reservoir is part of the Ramsar site Unterer Inn.

Power plant 
The power plant has a nameplate capacity of 84 MW and contains 6 Kaplan turbine-generators. The annual generation is about 485 mio. kwh. The turbines were supplied by Escher-Wyss and the generators by Siemens. Beginning in 1983 the original turbines with 4 blades were replaced with turbines with 5 blades. The average hydraulic head is 10.5 m.

See also

 List of power stations in Austria

External links

References

Hydroelectric power stations in Austria
Hydroelectric power stations in Germany
Gravity dams
Dams completed in 1944
Energy infrastructure completed in 1951
Buildings and structures in Upper Austria
Buildings and structures in Bavaria
Economy of Bavaria
Economy of Upper Austria